Alfonso Jones Kleiner (born 8 March 1951) is a Mexican archer. He competed in the men's individual event at the 1972 Summer Olympics.

References

External links
 

1951 births
Living people
Mexican male archers
Olympic archers of Mexico
Archers at the 1972 Summer Olympics
Place of birth missing (living people)